Lamoria pallens is a species of snout moth. It is found in South Africa.

References

Endemic moths of South Africa
Moths described in 1964
Tirathabini